National Highway 47 (NH 47) is a primary National Highway in India. It starts from Bamanbore in Gujarat and terminates at Nagpur in Maharashtra. Before renumbering of national highways in 2010, NH-47 was variously numbered as old national highways 8A, 59, 59A & 69.

Route 

NH47 transits through three states of India namely Gujarat, Madhya Pradesh and Maharashtra.

Gujarat
Bamanbore, Limbdi, Ahmedabad, Godhra, Dahod - M.P. border
Madhya Pradesh
Gujarat border - Indore, Betul - Maharashtra border
Maharashtra
M.P. border - Saoner, Nagpur

Toll Plazas along NH-47 

 Bamanbore Toll Plaza
 Bagodara(MoRTH) Toll Plaza
 Pithai Toll Plaza
 Vavdi Khurd Toll Plaza
 Bhatwada Toll Plaza
 Dattigaon Toll Plaza
 Methwada Toll Plaza
 Betul Toll Plaza
 Khambara Toll Plaza
 Patansaogi Toll Plaza

Junctions  
 
  Terminal near Bamanbore.
  near Limbdi
  near Sarkhej
  near Ahmedabad
  near Ahmedabad
  near Limkheda
  near Dahod
  near Jhabua
  near Dhar
  near Indore
  near indore
  near Kheri
  near Betul
  near Betul
  near Multai
  near Multai
  near Saoner
  near Saoner
  near Saoner
  near Dahegaon
  near Nagpur
  Terminal near Nagpur.

See also 
 List of National Highways in India
 List of National Highways in India by state

References

External links
NH 47 on OpenStreetMap

National highways in India
National Highways in Gujarat
National Highways in Madhya Pradesh
National Highways in Maharashtra
Transport in Nagpur